WBOW was a radio station on 640 AM in Terre Haute, Indiana, which broadcast between 1993 and 2001.

It was created by the relocation of the intellectual unit of WBOW (1230 AM) to a new license on 640 kHz. The station shut down when its licensee, Contemporary Media, Inc., had all of its licenses cancelled in response to a Federal Communications Commission investigation.

History

On June 9, 1993, WBOW and its adult standards format moved from 1230 AM to 640, a lower frequency with an improved coverage area. On 1230, the station was the first radio station in Terre Haute. A new station, WBFX, debuted on 1230 as WBOW moved to the new 640. Soon after, WBOW moved to a sports/talk format.

License cancellation
In 1994, Contemporary Media president Michael S. Rice was convicted of sexually abusing five teenagers in Missouri. The next year, the Federal Communications Commission opened a hearing to revoke the licenses of all of the stations owned by Contemporary Media and its sister companies, Contemporary Broadcasting and Lake Broadcasting, which also owned FM stations in Columbia, Missouri and Eldon, Missouri, as well as two additional unbuilt stations in the same state.

In 1997, an FCC administrative law judge ruled that the licenses should be revoked. The FCC affirmed the decision in March 1998. Rice appealed, losing in federal appeals court. In March 2001, the Supreme Court refused to hear the case. All Contemporary Media stations ceased operations by FCC order on October 4, 2001.

The WBOW call letters have since been used by several unrelated stations in the Terre Haute area, including the current WBOW (102.7 FM).

References

Radio stations established in 1993
Radio stations disestablished in 2001
BOW 640
Defunct radio stations in the United States
1993 establishments in Indiana
2001 disestablishments in Indiana
BOW 640